The Third Colijn cabinet was the cabinet of the Netherlands from 31 July 1935 until 24 June 1937. The cabinet was formed by the political parties Roman Catholic State Party (RKSP), Anti-Revolutionary Party (ARP), Christian Historical Union (CHU), Liberal State Party (LSP) and the Free-thinking Democratic League (VDB) after the resignation of the Second Colijn cabinet on 23 July 1935. The centre-right cabinet was a majority government in the House of Representatives and was a continuation of the previous Cabinet Colijn II. It was the third of five cabinets of Hendrikus Colijn, the Leader of the Anti-Revolutionary Party as Prime Minister.

Cabinet Members

 Retained this position from the previous cabinet.
 Appointment: Laurentius Nicolaas Deckers appointed Minister of Agriculture and Fisheries.

References

External links
Official

  Kabinet-Colijn III Parlement & Politiek

Cabinets of the Netherlands
1935 establishments in the Netherlands
1937 disestablishments in the Netherlands
Cabinets established in 1935
Cabinets disestablished in 1937